The Duonagao Suspension Bridge is a suspension bridge in Maolin District, Kaohsiung, Taiwan.

History
The bridge has been an important infrastructure for the Rukai people since the Japanese rule of Taiwan. It underwent maintenance which was completed on 17 February 2015.

Architecture
The head of the bridge is decorated with Rukai totems and decorations. The bridge can carry a maximum load of 100 people at a given time. It spans over 232 meters length which crosses the Zhuokou River and has a clearance of 103 meters below it.

See also
 List of bridges in Taiwan

References

Buildings and structures in Kaohsiung
Maolin District
Suspension bridges in Taiwan
Tourist attractions in Kaohsiung